Grossouvre is a commune in the Cher department in the Centre-Val de Loire region of France.

Geography

Sights
 The nineteenth-century church of St. Pierre
 The chateau, built over a castle dating from the twelfth century
 The Espace Métal - Halle de Grossouvre museum of industry

See also
Communes of the Cher department

References

Communes of Cher (department)